The Mirandese language ( or lhéngua mirandesa;  or ) is an Astur-Leonese language or language variety that is sparsely spoken in a small area of northeastern Portugal in Terra de Miranda (made up of the municipalities of Miranda do Douro, Mogadouro and Vimioso). The Assembly of the Republic granted it official recognition alongside Portuguese for local matters on 17 September 1998 with the law 7/99 of 29 January 1999. In 2001, Mirandese was officially recognised by the European Bureau for Lesser-Used Languages, which aims to promote the survival of the least spoken European languages.

Mirandese has a distinct phonology, morphology and syntax. It has its roots in the local Vulgar Latin spoken in the northern Iberian Peninsula.

Mirandese is a descendant of the Astur-Leonese variety spoken in the Kingdom of León and has both archaisms and innovations that differentiate it from the modern varieties of Astur-Leonese spoken in Spain. In recognition of these differences, and due to its political isolation from the rest of the Astur-Leonese speaking territory, Mirandese has adopted a different written norm to the one used in Spain for Astur-Leonese.

History
In the 19th century, José Leite de Vasconcelos described Mirandese as "the language of the farms, of work, home, and love between the Mirandese". Since 1986–87, it has been taught optionally to students at the primary and lower secondary level, and has thus been somewhat recovering. By Law 7/99, Mirandese was given official recognition by the Assembly of the Republic alongside Portuguese. The law provides for its promotion and allows its usage for local matters in Miranda do Douro.

Today Mirandese retains fewer than 5,000 speakers (but the number can be up to 15,000 if counting second-language speakers) in the villages of the Municipality of Miranda do Douro and in some eastern villages (such as Vilar Seco and Angueira); in Caçarelhos, it is considered recently extinct of the Municipality of Vimioso, and some linguistic influence can be observed at other villages of the municipality of Vimioso and the municipalities of Mogadouro, Macedo de Cavaleiros and Bragança.

Variants 
Three variants of the Mirandese language exist: Border Mirandese (Mirandés Raiano), Central Mirandese (Mirandés Central) and Sendinese (Sendinés). Most speakers of Mirandese also speak Portuguese.

The main differences between Mirandese in Portugal and the Astur-Leonese languages in Spain are caused by the dominant languages in each region. Mirandese has been influenced phonetically and in lexicon by Portuguese and the Astur-Leonese languages in Spain, by Spanish. All have distinctive orthography that phonetically reflects the respective main national languages. Another difference is that Mirandese and Leonese remain very conservative, while Asturian has undergone a greater amount of change.

Phonology
Some historical developments in Mirandese are the following:
Mirandese maintains distinct reflexes of all seven medieval Ibero-Romance sibilants:
{| class=wikitable style="text-align:center;"
|-
! Ibero-Romance||Mirandese||EuropeanPortuguese||North/CentralSpanish
|-
|||||||
|-
||||| ||
|-
| or || / || /  ||  / 
|-
| || / || / || / 
|-
| |||| || / 
|-
|  ||  / || / ||
|-
|  || ||||
|}

Portuguese spelling still distinguishes all seven and is identical to Mirandese spelling in this respect, but in pronunciation, Portuguese has reduced them to four  except in northern hinterland European Portuguese dialects, including those of the area that Mirandese is spoken. Northern/central Peninsular Spanish has also reduced them to four but in quite a different way: . Western Andalusian Spanish and Latin American Spanish have further reduced them to three: .

Retention of the initial  from Latin, like nearly all dialects of Western Romance (the major maverick being Spanish, where >  > ∅).
Proto-Romance medial clusters  and  became medial .
The cluster /-mb-/ is kept.
Proto-Romance  becomes :  > lume.
Falling diphthongs ,  preserved.
Final -o becomes .
Voiced sibilants are still maintained.
Retention of intervocalic , .
That happens not only before palatals, as in Aragonese, but also before nasals.
 is palatalized word-initially (as in other Astur-Leonese languages and in Catalan).

Consonants 

 Sibilant sounds  are phonetically apical  when orthographically , or as laminal  when orthograpically  (see above).
  is heard as an alveolar trill  in both initial or geminated positions, instead of a uvular  sound from Portuguese. It is heard as a tap  when single.
Voiced stops  can be lenited as fricatives .

Vowels 
All oral and nasal vowel sounds and allophones are the same from Portuguese, with different allophones:

 Vowels  can become glides  when preceding or following other vowels.

Morphology
As in Portuguese, Mirandese still uses the following synthetic tenses:
Synthetic pluperfect in -ra.
Future subjunctive in -r(e).
Personal infinitive in -r(e), which has the same endings as the future subjunctive but often differs as the personal infinitive always uses the infinitive stem, whereas the future subjunctive uses the past.

Protection measures 
The following measures have been taken to protect and develop Mirandese:

 allow primary teaching staff in the district of Miranda do Douro to teach in Mirandese, since 1986/1987, thanks to the ministerial authorisation published on the 9th September 1985;
 publish books in Mirandese and about the Mirandese language, promoted by the Council of Miranda do Douro;
 facilitate annual celebrations in the city as well as a literary competition, promoted by the Council of Miranda do Douro;
 use of Mirandese in town celebrations, official commemorations and, occasionally, on social media;
 publish two volumes of the Asterix comic books;
 translate all the toponymic signs in Miranda do Douro, promoted by the Council of Miranda do Douro in 2006;
 develop studies by research centres in Portugal, such as "Atlas Linguístico de Portugal", by the Centro de Linguística at University of Lisbon, and "Inquérito Linguístico Boléo", by the University of Coimbra;
 create Biquipédia, a Mirandese Wikipedia;
 make sites available in Mirandese, such as Photoblog and WordPress.
 Mirandese music was recorded by Roberto Leal for his albums "Canto da Terra" (2007) and "Raiç/Raíz" (2010).

Sample text
The following is a sample text of the Mirandese language, written by Amadeu Ferreira, and published in the newspaper Público, on 24 July 2007.

Then a comparison of the previous text in three modern languages of the Asturo-leonese group:

Recognition

Mirandese, given its status as a recognised language in Portugal after Portuguese, has been the subject in recent years of some publicity and attention in other parts of Portugal. A monthly chronicle in Mirandese, by researcher and writer Amadeu Ferreira, appears in the daily Portuguese national newspaper Público. The first volume of the Adventures of Asterix, named Asterix, L Goulés (Asterix the Gaul), was published in a Mirandese translation by Amadeu Ferreira in 2005, and sold throughout Portugal. Amadeu Ferreira also translated into Mirandese the epic poem by Camões, Os Lusíadas (Ls Lusíadas), under his pseudonym Francisco  and published it in 2009. In 2011, the four Gospels of the Bible's New Testament were translated into Mirandese, and in 2013 the entire Bible was translated into the language by Domingos Augusto Ferreira.

See also
Asturian language
Extremaduran language
Leonese language

References

Further reading

External links

Excerpt of The Lusiads in Mirandese
 Lei n. 7/99 dre.pt – Piece of legislation which officially recognizes Mirandese as a language of Portugal
Seth Kugel, "In Portugal, Mirandese spoken here—and only here", The New York Times, January 17, 2012

 
Endangered Romance languages
Languages of Portugal
Astur-Leonese languages